Tordenskjold was a torpedo ram built for the Royal Danish Navy in the early 1880s. The ship was sold for scrap in 1908.

Design and description
She displaced  and was fitted with a ram bow. Her crew consisted of 220 officers and enlisted men.

The ship was fitted with a pair of Burmeister & Wain compound-expansion steam engines, each engine driving one propeller shaft using steam provided by eight cylindrical boilers.

The ram's main battery consisted of a single 25-caliber  gun mounted in the barbette forward of the superstructure. She was also armed with four single 25-caliber  guns aft, each protected by a gun shield. For defense against torpedo boats, the ship was equipped with four 5-revolving barrel, 1-pounder Hotchkiss guns. The ship was also fitted with one  and three 355 mm torpedo tubes.

Tordenskjolds waterline was completely unprotected.

Construction and service
Tordenskjold, named for Vice Admiral Peter Tordenskjold, victor in the 1716 Battle of Dynekilen during the Great Northern War, was laid down on 5 June 1879 by the Orlogsværftet in Copenhagen, launched on 30 September 1880 and commissioned on 29 September 1882.

Notes

References
 
 
 

Ironclad warships of the Royal Danish Navy
1880 ships
Ships built in Copenhagen